Rudbar-e Qasran may refer to:
 Rudbar-e Qasran District
 Rudbar-e Qasran Rural District